All Fall Down is the eighth studio album by recording artist Shawn Colvin, released in 2012. The album is Colvin's second studio release on Nonesuch Records and features collaborations with Emmylou Harris and Patty Griffin.

Track listing
"All Fall Down" (Shawn Colvin, John Leventhal) – 3:49
"American Jerusalem" (Rod MacDonald) – 5:14
"Knowing What I Know Now" (Colvin, Leventhal) – 3:24
"Seven Times the Charm" (Colvin, Leventhal, Jakob Dylan) – 4:26
"Anne of the Thousand Days" (Colvin, Bill Frisell) – 4:26
"The Neon Lights of the Saints" (Colvin, Leventhal) – 2:55
"Change Is on the Way" (Colvin, Patty Griffin) – 3:16
"I Don't Know You" (Colvin, Viktor Krauss) – 3:32
"Fall of Rome" (Colvin, Kenny White) – 3:54
"Up On That Hill" (Mick Flannery) – 3:44
"On My Own" (B. W. Stevenson) – 3:01

Chart positions

Reception

Rolling Stone's Will Hermes gave the album three stars out of five, saying the music heals, and particularly praising the song "American Jerusalem", which he says "will resonate for anyone who ever hated the Big Apple, even for a New York minute".

References

Shawn Colvin albums
2012 albums